Callistocypraea aurantium, (formerly classified inside genus lyncina) common name the golden cowrie, is a species of sea snail, a cowry, a marine gastropod mollusk in the family Cypraeidae, the cowries.

Distribution
This is an uncommon-to-rare species which is found in the tropical waters of the west-central to south-central Pacific Ocean.

Habitat
This animal is usually found on the ocean side of islands, on the reef, at depths of 30 to 100+ feet.  It normally hides in the coral during daylight and comes out to feed at night.

Shell description
This is a large cowry (80 to 100 mm long). The shell that is yellowish brown to reddish orange on the dorsum, with white to cream colored margins. The mantle of the golden cowry is a combination of dark gray with translucent spots and patches that the orange color of the shell shows through. The scattered branching papillae are brownish gray, often white at the bases and tips.

Human use
In the past, on the Fiji Islands, this shell, known as "bulikula", was drilled at the ends and worn on a string around the neck by chieftains as a symbol of rank or privilege. As the shells are rare, they are prized by collectors.

References

 ''A Guide To Sh

External links
 On-line articles with Cypraea aurantium in the HAWAIIAN SHELL NEWS (1960-1994) 
 WoRMS page

Cypraeidae
Gastropods described in 1791
Taxa named by Johann Friedrich Gmelin